Princess Augusta of Saxe-Meiningen (6 August 1843 – 11 November 1919) was the daughter of Bernhard II, Duke of Saxe-Meiningen and his wife Princess Marie Frederica of Hesse-Kassel. She was the mother of Ernst II, Duke of Saxe-Altenburg.

Family and early life
Augusta was the only daughter of the Duke and Duchess of Saxe-Meiningen. Her only sibling was Georg, who would succeed their father in 1866. Georg was seventeen years older than she was.

Augusta's paternal grandparents were Georg I, Duke of Saxe-Meiningen and Luise Eleonore of Hohenlohe-Langenburg. Her maternal grandparents were William II, Elector of Hesse and Princess Augusta of Prussia, daughter of Frederick William II of Prussia.

Like her brother, Augusta was born in Meiningen. Despite the large age difference, they seemed to have a good relationship. He was a great lover of theatre; in 1856, he wrote his parents stating how happy he was that Augusta was allowed to attend the theatre and how their mother was more tolerant than she had been when he was a child, when she had declared that no child under thirteen should be allowed in the theatre.

Marriage
On 15 October 1862, Augusta married Prince Moritz of Saxe-Altenburg in Meiningen. He was fourteen years older, and was a younger son of Georg, Duke of Saxe-Altenburg and Marie Luise of Mecklenburg-Schwerin. They had five children:

Honours
    Ernestine duchies: Insignia of the Saxe-Ernestine House Order
 : Dame of the Order of Theresa, in Diamonds
 : Grand Cross of St. Catherine

Ancestry

References

Works cited

1843 births
1919 deaths
House of Saxe-Meiningen
House of Saxe-Altenburg
Princesses of Saxe-Meiningen
Princesses of Saxe-Altenburg
Daughters of monarchs